The 3"/23 caliber gun (spoken "three-inch-twenty-three-caliber") was the standard anti-aircraft gun for United States destroyers through World War I and the 1920s.  United States naval gun terminology indicates the gun fired a projectile 3 inches (76 mm) in diameter, and the barrel was 23 calibers long (barrel length is 3" x 23 = 69" or 1.75 meters.)

Description

The built-up gun with vertical sliding breech block weighed about 531 pounds (241 kg) and used fixed ammunition (case and projectile handled as a single assembled unit) with a 13-pound (6 kg) projectile at a velocity of 1650 feet per second (500 m/s).  Range was 10100 yards (9235 meters) at 45 degrees elevation.  Ceiling was 18000 feet (5500 meters) at the maximum elevation of 75 degrees.

History
The 3"/23 caliber cannon was the first purposely-designed anti-aircraft cannon to reach operational service in the US military, and was a further development of a 1 pounder cannon concept designed by Admiral Twining to meet the possible threat from airships being built by various navies.

A partially retractable version was mounted as a deck gun on the US L-class, and O-class submarines.
 
When World War II began, the 3"/23 caliber gun was outdated, and surviving United States destroyers built during the World War I era that were armed with the 3"/23 caliber were rearmed with dual-purpose 3"/50 caliber guns.  Where there was no air threat during World War II, the 3"/23 caliber gun was employed in the surface to surface role for use against submarines, and was mounted on submarine chasers, armed yachts, and various auxiliaries.  Some major warships carried 3"/23 caliber guns temporarily while awaiting installation of quad 1.1"/75 caliber guns.

The 3"/23 caliber gun was mounted on:

 s
 s
 s
 s
 s
 s
 Dubuque-class gunboats
 s
 s
 L-class submarines
 
 O-class submarines
 
s 
 s
 s

Notes

References 
 
 
 
 
 DiGiulian, Tony Navweaps.com 3"/23 caliber gun

External links

 

Naval anti-aircraft guns
World War II naval weapons
Naval guns of the United States
76 mm artillery